KQID-FM (93.1 MHz, "Q93") is a Top 40 (CHR) radio station licensed to Alexandria, Louisiana. The station serves the Central Louisiana, northern Acadiana, Natchez, Mississippi, and Monroe, Louisiana.  The station is owned by Cenla Broadcasting.  Its studios are located on Texas Avenue in Alexandria, and its transmitter is located southwest of Jena, Louisiana.

KQID-FM-HD2

K265FB (100.9 FM Translator, "Magic 100.9") is a Soft adult contemporary radio station in Alexandria, Louisiana. It signed on in February, 2015. It rebroadcasts KQID-FM HD2.

KQID-FM-HD3
KQID-HD3 simulcasts the programming of KDBS 1410 AM "ESPN 94.7" and FM translator K234CY 94.7 FM.

References

External links 
"Q93" KQID-FM official website

Radio stations in Louisiana
Contemporary hit radio stations in the United States
HD Radio stations
Mass media in Alexandria, Louisiana
Radio stations established in 1978
1978 establishments in Louisiana